Dieter Kaufmann (born 22 April 1941) is an Austrian composer.

Biography
Kaufmann was born in Vienna and grew up in Carinthia. 
He studied music, German philology, art history, violoncello, composition (with Karl Schiske, Gottfried von Einem, Olivier Messiaen and René Leibowitz) and electro-acoustic music (with Pierre Schaeffer and François Bayle at the Groupe de Recherches Musicales of the French Radio) in Vienna and Paris.

From 1970, Dieter Kaufmann taught electro-acoustic music at the University of Music and Dramatic Arts in Vienna. He is currently head of two master-classes, one for composition (since 1990) and the other for electro-acoustic composition (since 1997). He was head of the department for composition, conducting and sound engineering studies from 2000 to 2002. Kaufmann was president of the Austrian ISCM section from 1983 to 1988, president of the Society for Electro-acoustic Music in Austria (GEM) from 1988 to 1990. From 2001 to 2003 he was president of the Austrian Composers Union and in 2001 he became president of "Austro Mechana", the Austrian Copyright Society administering the mechanical rights of authors.

In 1975, together with his wife, actress Gunda König, Dieter Kaufmann founded the K&K Experimentalstudio. This Musical-Theatre-Ensemble has made numerous tours throughout Europe, North America, Latin America, Egypt and Taiwan.

Dieter Kaufmann wrote works in several fields of music: chamber, symphonic, and vocal music, musical theatre (four operas and many multi-media works), piano and organ works, works for wind orchestra, electro-acoustic, live electronic and computer music, as well as works in applied art. He had been awarded numerous national and international prizes, e.g. Förderungspreis der Stadt Wien (1967), Förderungspreis des Landes Kärnten (1974), Kompositionspreis des Musikprotokolls beim Steirischen Herbst (1975), Magisterium für elektroakustische Musik in Bourges, France (1988), Ernst-Krenek-Preis of the City of Vienna (1990), Prize of the City of Vienna for Music (1991), Würdigungspreis des Landes Kärnten (1992), Würdigungspreis des Bundes (1996).

References
Discog biography, accessed 3 February 2010
Preseence biography, accessed 3 February 2010
Kleine Zeitung article 'Landeskulturpreis geht an Komponist Dieter Kaufmann' (18 Nov 2008), accessed 3 February 2010

External links
Dieter Kaufmann page

1941 births
Living people
Musicians from Vienna
Austrian classical composers
20th-century classical composers
Austrian male classical composers
20th-century male musicians